Ogtay Sabir oglu Asadov (born January 3, 1955) is an Azerbaijani politician who has served as the Speaker of the National Assembly of Azerbaijan between 2005 and 2020.

Early life
Asadov was born in the village of Shaharjik in Syunik Province in Armenia. He graduated from the Machinery Manufacturing Technologies Department of the Azerbaijan State Oil Academy. From 1976 on, Asadov worked as the assistant manager and then manager at the Baku Air Conditioners Plant. In 1979, he was hired as the Senior Engineer at Azerbaijan Main Renovation and Special Construction Department and then worked in the management of Azərsantexquraşdırma, a subsidiary of the same organization.
In 1996–2004, he was the President of the Absheron Su water management company and, in 2004–2005, he was the President of Azersu. He is a member of the International Water Association.

Political career
He was elected to the National Assembly of Azerbaijan in the 2000 parliamentary elections and subsequently re-elected in 2005 from Absheron Rayon and 2010 from Binagadi district of Baku. On December 2, 2005, he was elected the Speaker of the National Assembly by the members of the parliament and re-elected on November 29, 2010. He is the head of the Azerbaijani delegation to the Inter-Parliamentary Assembly of CIS and to the Parliamentary Assembly of Turkic-speaking Countries (TÜRKPA).
 
He is also a member of the Political Council of the New Azerbaijan Party. He was granted the Medal of Honor by respective decree of  President Ilham Aliyev in 2014.

Wealth 
During his 14 years in parliament, Asadov earned an annual salary under $30,000 and was not allowed to work in the private sector. The Pandora Papers leaks revealed that Asadov and his family acquired assets worth nearly $10 million in London, Dubai, and Moscow, which raised questions as to the sources of Asadov's finances.

Personal life
Asadov is fluent in English and Russian. He is married and has two children.

See also
Cabinet of Azerbaijan
Government of Azerbaijan

References 

Armenian Azerbaijanis
1955 births
Living people
Members of the National Assembly (Azerbaijan)
People from Kapan
Chairmen of the National Assembly (Azerbaijan)